Dennis H. Cochrane, CM (born 26 October 1950 in Moncton, New Brunswick) is a Canadian politician and civil servant.

He graduated from the New Brunswick Teacher's College in 1970, received a Bachelor of Arts degree from the University of New Brunswick in 1974, received a Bachelor of Education in 1974 and a Master of Education in 1981 from the University of Moncton. 

He was elected to the Moncton City Council in 1977 and he was elected Mayor of Moncton in 1979, being re-elected in 1980. In 1983, he was Councillor-at-Large of Moncton. He was elected to the House of Commons of Canada representing the riding of Moncton in the 1984 as a Progressive Conservative (PC). He was defeated in 1988.

He next entered provincial politics and was elected in 1991 as leader of the Progressive Conservative Party of New Brunswick. In this role he regained seats for his party in the 1991 election, the PCs having been shut out in the 1987 election. Though his party won only three seats, it gained others later through by-elections and seemed poised to win, at least, official opposition status in the coming election. The opposition Confederation of Regions Party was suffering internal strife and a number of its members chose to sit as independents. Cochrane invited them to join the PC caucus; however, they declined and one of the Acadian members quit in protest. As a result, Cochrane resigned the leadership in 1995.

Following the victory of the Progressive Conservative Party of Nova Scotia in 1999 election, he was named deputy minister of Education for the neighbouring province of Nova Scotia.

He resigned at the end of 2009 when he accepted a position as Interim President and Vice Chancellor of St. Thomas University (New Brunswick) effective January 2010, replacing outgoing Michael W. Higgins. This appointment continued until 1 July 2011, when he was succeeded by Dawn Russell.

Electoral history

References

External links
 

1950 births
Living people
University of New Brunswick alumni
Canadian schoolteachers
21st-century Canadian civil servants
Mayors of Moncton
Members of the House of Commons of Canada from New Brunswick
Progressive Conservative Party of New Brunswick MLAs
Progressive Conservative Party of Canada MPs
Canadian educators
Leaders of the Progressive Conservative Party of New Brunswick